Giuseppe Adami (4 February 187812 October 1946) was an Italian librettist, playwright and music critic, he was best known for his collaboration with Giacomo Puccini on the  operas La rondine (1917), Il tabarro (1918) and Turandot (1926).

Works of plays
Adami also wrote several plays, such as I fioi di Goldoni, Una capanna e il tuo cuore (1913), Capelli bianchi (1915), Felicità Colombo (1935) and Nonna Felicità (1936). The latter was adapted into a film in 1938 by director Mario Mattoli.

Early life, training  and biography
Adami was born in Verona.  He graduated at the University of Padua in Law but dedicated his career as a writer, theatre playwright, and then music critic. After the death of Puccini, Adami published a collection of the composer's letters in Epistolario (1928). He also published his personal recollections; Giulio Ricordi e i suoi musicisti (1933); Giacomo Puccini (1935) (this was one of the earliest biographies of the composer); and a second biography of Puccini Il romanzo della vita di Giacomo Puccini (1942).

Librettos
Adami also wrote librettos for other composers including Riccardo Zandonai's La via della finestra (1919); and Franco Vittadini's Anima allegra (1921) and Nazareth (1925). He was a music critic for La sera (Milan) and for the review La comedia from 1931 to 1934. Adami acted as publicist with the house of Ricordi to the end of his life.  He died in Milan aged 67.

References

External links 

 Giuseppe Adami biography
 
 La via della finestra Vocal score from Sibley Music Library Digital Scores Collection

1878 births
1946 deaths
Writers from Verona
University of Padua alumni
Italian music critics
Italian opera librettists
Italian male dramatists and playwrights
Italian male non-fiction writers